Eltje "Elt" Drenth  (29 May 1949 – 3 February 1998) was a Dutch swimmer. He competed at the 1968 Summer Olympics in the 200 m and 4×200 m freestyle events, but failed to reach the finals.

References

1949 births
1998 deaths
Dutch male freestyle swimmers
Olympic swimmers of the Netherlands
Swimmers at the 1968 Summer Olympics
Sportspeople from Dordrecht